Arab Kheyl (also Romanized as ‘Arab Kheyl; also known as ‘Arab Maḩalleh) is a village in Rudpey-ye Jonubi Rural District, in the Central District of Sari County, Mazandaran Province, Iran. At the 2006 census, its population was 222, in 55 families.

References 

Populated places in Sari County